Queen Oja (27 November 1950) is an Indian politician. She has been elected to the Lok Sabha, lower house of the Parliament of India from Guwahati, Assam in the 2019 Indian general election as a member of the Bharatiya Janata Party. She was earlier the Mayor of Guwahati.

References

External links
 Official biographical sketch in Parliament of India website

1950 births
Living people
Bharatiya Janata Party politicians from Assam
Asom Gana Parishad politicians
People from Guwahati
Mayors of places in Assam
Women mayors of places in Assam
20th-century Indian women politicians
20th-century Indian politicians
India MPs 2019–present
Women members of the Lok Sabha
21st-century Indian women politicians